Martin Fréminet (24 September 1567 – 18 June 1619) was a French painter.

Biography
Fréminet was born and died in Paris.  According to the RKD he was a painter and engraver who is considered a member of the Second "School of Fontainebleau". Several of his ceiling decorations at the Palace of Fontainebleau survive.

Fréminet, a French historical painter, was born in Paris in 1567. He received his first instruction from his father, a tapestry designer. He soon made some progress in his career in Paris, and executed several commissions, including a picture of St. Sebastian for the church of St. Joseph. But it was to Italy that his thoughts turned, and about 1592 he set out thither. At this time the controversies raised by the Naturalisti were at their height, and into them Fréminet entered with ardour. His time was chiefly passed at Rome, Parma, and Venice, and he directed his most serious attention to the works of Parmigiano and Michelangelo, the study of the latter having a great influence on him.

After an absence of about sixteen years he returned to his native country by way of Lombardy and Savoy, and in the latter he painted some important works for the ducal palace. His fame had preceded him, for on the death of Toussaint Du-Breuil in 1602 he was appointed by Henry IV his principal painter, obtaining at the same time by purchase a sinecure post about the court. In 1608 he commenced for the king the decoration of the chapel at Fontainebleau, which was executed in oil on plaster. In the five compartments of the ceiling he depicted Noah entering the Ark, the Fall of the Angels, Our Lord in Glory, the Angel Gabriel, and the Creation. Behind the altar he painted the Annunciation, and he also executed other frescoes representing kings, prophets, &c., and scenes from the life of Christ. This masterpiece was not finished until the succeeding reign, and on its completion, in 1615, he received the cross of the Order of St. Michael.

Fréminet died in Paris in 1619, and was buried, in accordance with his desire, in the Abbey of Barbeaux, near Fontainebleau, for which he had painted several pictures, which were destroyed when that Abbey was burnt in 1793. He left a son Louis, who followed in his father's footsteps as a painter. The poet Regnier was his friend, and dedicated to him his tenth Satire. Fréminet had a good knowledge of architectural perspective and of anatomy, though his aspirations after the grandeur of Michelangelo frequently led him into exaggerations, and have caused him to be much decried. To do him justice, however, it must be owned that he marks a great advance in the history of the French school. The works of his predecessor. Cousin, are no doubt the earliest which show the impress of Italian art, but it was Fréminet who first fully felt and evidenced the influence of the great Italian masters. He is seen at his best in those works in which the spirit of Parmigiano is most apparent. His style of working was singular: he painted a picture in separate portions, without sketching or designing the rest of the composition.

References

Attribution:

External links

1567 births
1619 deaths
16th-century French painters
French male painters
17th-century French painters
Painters from Paris
Premiers peintres du Roi
French Mannerist painters